The 35th Blue Dragon Film Awards ceremony was held on December 17, 2014 at the Sejong Center for the Performing Arts in Seoul. It was broadcast on SBS and hosted by Kim Hye-soo and Yoo Jun-sang.

Nominations and winners
Complete list of nominees and winners:

(Winners denoted in bold)

References

2014 film awards
Blue Dragon Film Awards
Blue